The 2022–23 season is the 136th season in the existence of Barnsley and the club's first season back in League One since the 2018–19 season following their relegation from the Championship in the previous season. In addition to the league, they will also compete in the 2022–23 FA Cup, the 2022–23 EFL Cup and the 2022–23 EFL Trophy.

Transfers

In

Out

Loans in

Loans out

Pre-season and friendlies
Crewe Alexandra and Worksop Town announced friendlies with Barnsley on 18 May 2022. Belper Town did likewise on 24 May. On June 1, Barnsley confirmed their pre-season schedule. A trip to Harrogate Town was later added to the schedule.

Competitions

Overall record

League One

League table

Results summary

Results by round

Matches

On 23 June, the league fixtures were announced.

FA Cup

The Reds were drawn away to Bolton Wanderers in the first round, at home to Crewe Alexandra in the second round and away to Derby County in the third round.

EFL Cup

Barnsley were drawn away to Middlesbrough in the first round and to Leeds United in the second round.

EFL Trophy

On 23 June, the group stage draw was finalised, group Barnsley in Northern Group E alongside Doncaster Rovers, Lincoln City and Newcastle United U21s. In the second round, The Reds were drawn away to Port Vale.

References

Barnsley
Barnsley F.C. seasons
English football clubs 2022–23 season